WJHO is a radio station airing a classic rock format, licensed to Alexander City, Alabama, broadcasting on 89.7 MHz FM. The station is owned by Volunteer Broadcasting Inc.

In January 2022 WJHO changed their format from Christian rock/rap to classic rock, branded as "89.7 The Classic".

References

External links

Classic rock radio stations in the United States
JHO
Radio stations established in 2008
2008 establishments in Alabama